Pulicherla is a village and a Mandal in Nalgonda district in the state of Telangana in India.
Pulicherla is a large village located in Peddavoora mandal of Nalgonda district, Andhra Pradesh with total 1037 families residing. The Pulicherla village has population of 4148 of which 2075 are males while 2073 are females as per Population Census 2011.

Schools 
 ZP Primary School
 ZPHS (High School)- ZPHS School has a Library with almost 700+ plus books. FACTSET SYSTEMS INDIA PVT LTD supported to set up Library
 Montessori school
 Sri Saraswathi Vidya Nilayam Estd:1991
Founder:MASNA VENUGOPAL MA.(History/Sociology/Political Science).M.Ed.LLM (PhD)

References

External links 
 

Villages in Nalgonda district